Wildseed Farms is a wildflower farm near Fredericksburg, Texas, United States. It is the largest working wildflower farm in the country. The farm won the Garden Center 2001 Innovator award.

History 
The farm opened in 1983 in Eagle Lake as a seed producer and initially only allowed the public to visit in April of every year. These visit days proved to be extremely popular, so much so that the owners, John and Marilyn Thomas, decided to relocate to a more accessible location. In 1995, they purchased the plot on Texas State Highway 290. Development for a retail facility and visitor center was completed in 1997. Because the farm is located near Fredericksburg, a town that has a 19th-century feel to it, the main buildings of the farm were also constructed to match the decor of the town.

Revenue and operations 
Wildseed Farms does about $4 million in sales each year, with approximately $1.5 million coming from the retail facility, which can see roughly 100,000 visitors between March and May of each year. Besides plant sales, the farm also has a butterfly area and hosts live concerts and other attractions.

References

External links 

 Wildseed Farms

Farms in Texas
Tourist attractions in Gillespie County, Texas
Tourist attractions in Texas
Companies established in 1983
Seed companies
Privately held companies based in Texas
Companies based in Texas
Agriculture companies of the United States
Buildings and structures in Gillespie County, Texas